Kavan Joel Smith (born May 6, 1970) is a Canadian actor known for playing Major Evan Lorne in Stargate Atlantis and Stargate SG-1, as Agent Jed Garrity in The 4400, and as Leland Coulter in When Calls the Heart.

Early life and career
Born in Edmonton, Alberta, Smith was raised by his father after his parents divorced. He attended the University of Calgary for a year and a half and then enrolled in the performing arts program at Mount Royal University. He began his acting career with a leading role in Destiny Ridge in 1993. In Stargate: Atlantis, Smith appeared in 29 episodes as the recurring character Major Evan Lorne. He also appeared in two episodes of Stargate SG-1 (the episodes "Enemy Mine" in Season 7 and "The Road Not Taken" in Season 10) as Major Lorne.

He has also guest-starred in numerous television shows including Supernatural, Smallville, Sanctuary, Tru Calling, Battlestar Galactica, Outer Limits, Human Target, and The Twilight Zone. He had a recurring role as Deputy Andy on Syfy's Eureka. Smith co-starred with Felicia Day in the 2012 SyFy film adaptation Red: Werewolf Hunter, which tells the modern dark story of Red Riding Hood. He also had a starring role in SyFy movie Metal Shifters in 2010.

In addition to acting, Kavan has also narrated the Canadian-made documentaries Combat School and Jetstream.

Filmography

Film

Television

References

External links 

 

1970 births
Living people
Canadian male television actors
Canadian male voice actors
Male actors from Edmonton